"It Began in Afrika" is a song by British electronic music duo the Chemical Brothers. It was released as the first single from their fourth album Come with Us on 10 September 2001. Originally named "Electronic Battle Weapon 5" and released for DJs as a white label in June 2001, "It Began in Afrika" became a hit in clubs and was renamed for its official release. The song contains vocal samples from the track "Drumbeat" by American musician Jim Ingram, who was given a writing credit.

The official release of the song came four months before Come with Us. The song received positive reviews from critics, and reached number eight in the UK Singles Chart. Despite this, the song does not feature on either of the standard versions of their singles compilations Singles 93–03 or Brotherhood, although the latter featured the original white label version on its bonus disc.

Background
The duo created the track in 2000, premiering it in December 2000 when the band supported U2. Tom Rowlands of the duo initially have mixed feelings about the track, saying it had "quite a lot of percussion, big, sweeping sort of stuff. Live conga playing, quite spaced out. It's like Body & Soul, but really, really hard and twisted, it's like high-impact, full-on, but with more organic sounds, and quite intense, without the good vibe." Regardless, though the track was popular with fans, and eventually was released as a white label release, "Electronic Battle Weapon 5", in June 2001, the fifth installment in their series of "Electronic Battle Weapon" twelve-inch singles intended for disc jockeys to play in sets.

After completing their fourth album, Come with Us, the track was renamed "It Began in Afrika" and released as an official retail single on 10 September 2001. The original length of the song, which was almost 10 minutes, was now edited into two different versions, the standard version of the song, which lasts eight and a half minutes, and the radio edit, which lasts three and a half minutes. The version which appears on Come with Us lasts six and a quarter minutes, seguing into the following track, "Galaxy Bounce".

The single release reached number eight in the UK Singles Chart on 16 September 2001. In addition to the full length and radio edit versions of the track, the single release also contained the B-side "Hot Rhythm Acid 1".

Critical reception
The track received positive reviews from critics. Nathan Rooney of Pitchfork Media said the track "is a rapid, heart-pounding conga workout that distills the quick reflexes and primal urges of a cheetah hunt under a deadpan voice repeating, "It Began In Afrika-ka-ka"," and, noting its position as the second track on Come with Us, stated the album "flies out of the gates unexpectedly with its first three tracks, immediately dragging the listener through a relentless torrent of beats and sonic energy."

Robert Christgau called the track the best "disco disc" on the special edition of the duo's compilation album Brotherhood.

Marshall Bowden of PopMatters said "It Began in Afrika" is "a kind of electronic exotica where the various percussion (both sampled and real), big cat sounds, and travelogue narrator sample combine to create an ersatz aural safari a la Les Baxter. The polyrhythmic percussion flights (timbales and bongos) are like a cross between a Sanatana concert and the Grateful Dead parking lot. Overall, though, the track is strong and trades on the aggressive Chemical beats sound while throwing a new angle into the mix that is sure to delight listeners and dancers."

In a more mixed-to-positive review, after noting the album is "steeped in retro-synth glory", Sal Cinquemani of Select Magazine said "It Began in Afrika" is "ripe with tribal beats and jungle-cat snarls (is that He-Man's Battlecat?), swiftly building into a percussive techno jam session. The track's weakness, however, lies in its all-too-prominent spliced-up lyrical slogans."

Track listings
UK CD and cassette single, US and Australian CD single
 "It Began in Afrika" (radio edit) – 3:35
 "It Began in Afrika" – 8:39
 "Hot Acid Rhythm 1" – 5:04

UK and US 12-inch single, European CD single
A. "It Began in Afrika" – 8:39
B. "Hot Acid Rhythm 1" – 5:04

Credits and personnel
Credits are lifted from the Come with Us album booklet.

Studios
 Recorded at Miloco Studios (South London, England)
 Edited in the Miloco Studios basement
 Mastered at The Exchange (London, England)

Personnel

 The Chemical Brothers – production
 Tom Rowlands – writing
 Ed Simons – writing
 Jim Ingram – writing ("Drumbeat")
 Steve Dub – engineering
 Greg Fleming – assistant engineering
 Cheeky Paul – editing
 Mike Marsh – mastering

Charts

Weekly charts

Year-end charts

Release history

See also
 List of number-one dance singles of 2001 (U.S.)

References

The Chemical Brothers songs
2001 singles
2001 songs
Astralwerks singles
Number-one singles in Spain
Songs written by Ed Simons
Songs written by Tom Rowlands
Virgin Records singles